#NoFilter is a hashtag used on social media to indicate that no social media filter has been used. It is commonly used on Instagram. According to research by Spredfast in 2018, 11% of Instagram posts with #NoFilter did use a filter.

Trivia 

 Sarah Frier named her book on the history of Instagram No Filter: The Inside Story of Instagram.

See also 
 Dating NoFilter
 NoFilter App

References 

Social media